Westfield Kotara (previously known as Kotara Fair and Garden City) is a large shopping centre in the suburb of Kotara in Newcastle.

Transport 
Kotara station is 800 metres away from Westfield Kotara and is on the Main Northern railway line. The station is serviced by NSW TrainLink services which operate between Sydney and Newcastle.

Westfield Kotara is served by Newcastle Transport bus services to Broadmeadow, Charlestown, Swansea Heads, Wallsend and Warners Bay, as well as local surrounding suburbs. The majority of its bus services are located on Park Avenue outside the centre.

Westfield Kotara has multi-level car parks with around 4000 spaces. The complex has walk in entry available via the bus stop, as well as an entry way via the park at the rear of the facility. Historically, egress was also available directly through multiple parts of the David Jones, a number of these have since been closed (as a response to excess shoplifting).

History

Kotara Fair opened on 6 October 1965 and was developed by Woolworths. It featured a Woolworths supermarket, a Big W department and store 27 speciality stores. 

Kotara Fair was purchased by David Jones in 1971 and plans were drawn to extend the centre to consolidate its strong position in the marketplace. The $8 million expansion began in early 1973 and was completed in October 1974. Kotara Fair was renamed Garden City in line with other David Jones Garden City centres. The Big W department store closed and was replaced by David Jones. As part of the redevelopment, David Jones, Norman Ross and 24 speciality stores were added. Further redevelopment occurred in 1977 when Norman Ross closed on level one. This provided the establishment of the 'Top Mall' which provided space for 13 additional retailers in the centre including Shoeys, Best & Less, Reuben F Scarf and Angus & Coote. This extension also provided the centre with 8 offices and professional suites.

In 1980 Garden City was purchased by AMP for $104 million. Another  expansion in 1988 created the largest shopping centre in the Hunter Region. The grand opening was on 15 March 1988. The $62 million expansion added a Super Kmart and Venture department store as well as bringing the total number of retailers to 120.

On 28 December 1989, shortly after completion of another expansion program, the centre suffered significant damage during the Newcastle earthquake. Most affected were the upper levels of the car park adjacent to Northcott Drive and the Super Kmart. Despite the damage, repairs were effected quickly. 

The Super Kmart store was split into Kmart and Coles in 1990. 

In 1995 Coles relocated to the ground level and Toys "R" Us opened in its place.

Garden City was refurbished in 1998 with the relocation of Woolworths and the addition of 14 speciality stores and an additional 148 car parking spaces.

Following the purchase of Garden City by the Westfield Group, the centre was renamed Westfield Kotara on 11 August 2003. Westfield worked for over a year to expand the centre, in an expansion that significantly increased its size. 

The redevelopment commenced on 8 May 2006 and added a Target discount department store, JB Hi-Fi and 120 speciality stores. The new food court and half the mall opened on 16 August 2007. The Fashion Mall was completed in September 2007.

In 2010 a development application was submitted for an eight screen cinema complex and possible ten pin bowling alley as part of a $12.5 million expansion, in response to the opening of the new Charlestown Square in late 2010. The $55 million redevelopment commenced in April 2015 on parts of the rooftop car park. On 26 November 2015 the open air entertainment precinct known as "The Rooftop" opened. The Rooftop has design drawn from the Hunter Valley Vineyards and the relaxed Novocastrian approach to life. The Rooftop included between eight and 10 local and national restaurants and food outlets and a live music venue. The eight screen Event Cinemas complex opened on 17 December 2015 just in time for the Star Wars: The Force Awakens film.

On 12 October 2017 Westfield Kotara commenced its $160 million redevelopment. During this development Kmart, JB Hi-Fi and Toys "R" Us temporarily closed. The redevelopment was completed in October 2018 with the grand opening date on 18 October 2018. Swedish retailer H&M opened on 4 October. This development featured new Youth and Urban Precinct on level 2 located next to H&M and is in line with the region’s surf, skate and lifestyle culture and includes a diverse mix of retailers. The youth precinct features a mini skatepark complete with half-pipe inside Parrey Skate store.  It also featured a new look Kmart and JB Hi-Fi. The level 2 mall featured natural skylight that runs throughout the mall and darker accent colours to give it a modern edge. Travelators were installed to provide better access to Level 2, 2M and 3. Spanish retailer Zara opened on 8 November 2018.

This development also included the extension of "The Rooftop" precinct which included the opening of a gym, six restaurants and Timezone which opened in April 2019. Since the original development application was to include a bowling alley, this was later dropped. However Timezone features a bowling alley, laser tag, Spin Zone bumper cars and gaming arcades. 

There were also changes in the car park with over 500 spaces added. The new level 3 car park features both outdoor and undercover car spaces and a solar-powered shade canopy, as part of the centre’s broader sustainability redevelopment.

Tenants
Westfield Kotara has 82,433m² of floor space. The major retailers include David Jones, Kmart, Target, Coles, Woolworths, H&M, Zara, JB Hi-Fi, Timezone and Event Cinemas.

References

Westfield Group
Shopping centres in New South Wales
Shopping malls established in 1965
1965 establishments in Australia